is a Japanese composer and sound engineer formally for Bandai Namco Entertainment. His most known work surfaced with Katamari Damacy soundtracks, on which he served as a sound director. Other notable works include various tracks in the Tekken and Ridge Racer series.

Biography 
As a child, Miyake attended his mother's Electone classes. However, he could not adapt to the pieces he was given to play. He also listened to anime themes, disco and Yellow Magic Orchestra.

Prior to joining Namco, Miyake was a university student specializing in management information. His first game with the company was Tekken 3. This led to him working on subsequent titles in the franchise, including Tekken Tag Tournament and Tekken 4. He considers his work on these games to be his "specialty".

In 2000, Miyake worked with Namco director Keita Takahashi on a video project called "Texas 2000". Takahashi was so impressed with his work that he gave him full responsibility as sound director on the 2004 release Katamari Damacy. He was given creative freedom, and considers the sound design and music to have been a major aspect of the game's success. He aimed to write catchy melodies for the game, feeling that video game music since the second half of the 90s had become unmemorable. He also served as the sound director for future titles in the series, and composed for Takahashi's Noby Noby Boy in 2009.

In 2011, he left Bandai Namco to become a freelance composer and established Miyakeyuu Studio, feeling that he would not grow any further as a musician at the company. He has continued to contribute tracks to further Bandai Namco games, and has also worked on games by other companies. He also started a side project with former Bandai Namco co-worker Yoshihito Yano, named Mikanz. Miyake attended MAGFest 13 in January 2015, holding a QA conference and performing various Katamari Damacy series songs under his DJ handle of "eutron". Yano also attended the event.

Outside of his work in the video game industry, he has served as a part-time lecturer at Tokyo Polytechnic University since 2014.

Works

References

External links

Yuu Miyake at MobyGames

1973 births
Japanese audio engineers
Japanese composers
Japanese male composers
Katamari
Living people
Video game composers
Japanese techno musicians